Acasis appensata is a moth of the family Geometridae. It is found in the Palearctic realm.

The wingspan is 21–23 mm.

The larvae feed on Actaea spicata.

Subspecies
Acasis appensata appensata
Acasis appensata baicalensis (Bang-Haas, 1906)

External links

Fauna Europaea
Lepiforum.de

Trichopterygini
Palearctic Lepidoptera
Taxa named by Eduard Friedrich Eversmann
Moths described in 1842